Emil Rotong (30 October 1878 – 10 September 1970) was a German gymnast. He competed in the men's individual all-around event at the 1900 Summer Olympics.

References

External links

1878 births
1970 deaths
German male artistic gymnasts
Olympic gymnasts of Germany
Gymnasts at the 1900 Summer Olympics
Sportspeople from Mulhouse